Barney Fagan (January 12, 1850 – January 12, 1937) was an American performer, director, choreographer, and composer.

Career 
Barney Fagan was born as Bernard J. Fagan in Boston, son of Douglass and Ellen Fagan. His father was the deputy wharfinger (old term that today is called a harbormaster) at Battery Wharf.   He made his first professional appearance in Boston at the Howard Athenaeum in 1860, as the Cabin Boy in The Pilot of Brest. He remained at this theatre several seasons until 1865 when he played his first minstrel engagement with the Morris Brothers in Boston.

In 1870, Fagan went to Saint John, New Brunswick, Canada, and appeared with Pete Lee's Minstrels. In 1873 he joined Buckley's Serenaders in Boston, and took a fellow dancer, Joe Parks, as a partner. During the period 1873-1876, Fagan and Parks, known as the American Lads, played variety engagements. In 1876 he did the famous Heifer dance with Richard Golden in Evangeline. Mr. Fagan next joined John Fenton in a dancing duet, and continued with him until 1878, when he formed a partnership with Lizzie Mulvey, which lasted one season. Fagan's specialty at that time was "clog dancing"—which was a dance performed while wearing wooden-soled shoes, a very popular form of stage entertainment in the late 19th century.

Beginning in 1879, Mr. Fagan allied himself with Barlow, Wilson, Primrose and West's Minstrels, and continued with them until the company's dissolution in June, 1882. During the three years with Barlow and Wilson, he was general producer and performed as a soloist. Possibly Mr. Fagan's greatest achievement was in organizing and producing Willis Sweatnam, Billy Rice and Fagan's Minstrels, which gave their first performance at Albany, New York, July 25, 1887. This troupe was allegedly the largest minstrel company to travel America's entertainment circuit in the 19th century, featuring 105 performers on parade with 88 in the regular company.

In the following years, Fagan performed with various companies, including Thatcher, Primrose and West; Barlow, Wilson and Rankin's; and Cleveland's Minstrels, where Fagan performed opposite to Luke Schoolcraft.

Outside of minstrelsy, Fagan appeared in Blackface in such plays as Paradise Alley, and, in 1890, appeared in High Roller, a production of his own company. At this time, Fagan's work drew praise for notable marches, including "West Point Cadets", the "Phantom Guards" and "The Dance of the Popinjays". During this same period, he was general producer for Corinne for several seasons.

As a songwriter he was no less prominent, penning: "Everybody Takes Their Hat Off to Me" and "My Gal is A High Born Lady". His plays were popular, too: The Land of Fancy and The Game of Love. Starting in 1895, Fagan performed regularly with Herietta Byron, of the Byron Sisters.

In the opinion of Sigmund Spaeth, Fagan's compositions were important in the development of ragtime. In his book A History of Popular Music in America (1948), Spaeth said:

He was highly revered by the end of his career. On August 31, 1919, a testimonial dinner was given in his honor in Manhattan, attracting the theatrical luminaries of that era, including Irving Berlin.

Barney Fagan died on his 87th birthday, January 12, 1937, in Bay Shore, Long Island, New York.

Chronology of theatrical productions/compositions

References
Monarchs of Minstrelsy, from "Daddy" Rice to Date, By Edward Le Roy Rice, Published by Kenny, New York, 1911.
Broadway to Hollywood, MGM Film Released September 15, 1933.

Footnotes

External links
 
 

1850 births
1937 deaths
American male classical composers
American classical composers
Songwriters from Massachusetts
American musical theatre composers
American film score composers
American male film score composers
American pianists
Vaudeville performers
Musicians from Massachusetts
Blackface minstrel performers
American male pianists
American male songwriters